The following is a list of notable Auburnites, people who have lived or are currently living in Auburn, Alabama.  Many on the list lived in the city while students at Auburn University.

Academics

Donald J. Boudreaux - economist, chairman of George Mason University Department of Economics
Charles Curran - theologian
John M. Darby - botanist
Robert B. Ekelund, Jr. - economist, author
Francis Ernest Lloyd - botanist
Olav Kallenberg - mathematician
Krystyna Kuperberg - mathematician
Carolina Henriette Mac Gillavry - chemist, crystallographer
Tibor R. Machan - philosopher, retired from Chapman University in 2014 and past research fellow at the Hoover Institution
Samuel Mockbee - architect, founder of Auburn's Rural Studio, 2004 AIA Gold Medal
Mike Reed - computer scientist, director United Nations University International Institute for Software Technology
Frederick Chapman Robbins - pediatrician, virologist, Nobel Laureate in Medicine, 1956
Paul Rudolph - architect, chairman of Yale Department of Architecture, 1958-1965
Joseph T. Salerno - economist
Mark Thornton - economist
Thomas E. Woods, Jr. - historian, author of The Politically Incorrect Guide to American History, Meltdown: A Free-Market Look at Why the Stock Market Collapsed, the Economy Tanked, and Government Bailouts Will Make Things Worse and other books

Art and literature

Ace Atkins - author
Tim Dorsey - author
Bill Holbrook - cartoonist, "On The Fast Track", "Save Havens" and "Kevin & Kell"
Jimmy Johnson - cartoonist, "Arlo and Janis"
Madison Jones - author
Bruce Larsen - artist
Barry Moser - printmaker and illustrator
Heberto Padilla - Cuban poet
Lallah Miles Perry - artist
Anne Rivers Siddons - author
William Spratling - silversmith and artist, "father of Mexican silver"

Astronautics

Jan Davis - space shuttle astronaut, STS-47, STS-60
Hank Hartsfield - space shuttle astronaut, STS-4, STS-41-D, STS-61-A
Ken Mattingly - astronaut, Apollo 16, STS-4
Kathryn C. Thornton - space shuttle astronaut, 2nd American woman in space, STS-33, STS-73
Clifton Williams - astronaut, Project Gemini
James S. Voss - space shuttle astronaut, STS-44, STS-53, STS-69, STS-101, ISS

Athletics

Charles Barkley - professional basketball player, All-Star
Joe Beckwith - professional baseball player
Brandon Boudreaux, professional Canadian football player
Terry Bowden -  football coach, sports commentator
James Brooks - professional football player, All-Pro
Ronnie Brown - professional football player
Kirsty Coventry - swimmer, gold medalist 2004 Olympics
Rashaan Evans - NFL linebacker and first-round pick of the Atlanta Falcons
Al Del Greco - professional football player, radio sports personality
Vince Dooley - football coach
Jason Dufner - PGA Professional Golfer & former walk-on at Auburn University
Rowdy Gaines - swimmer, gold medalist 1984 Olympics, world record holder, and television sports commentator
Harvey Glance - athlete, gold medalist 1976 Olympics
Jamie Hampton - professional tennis player
John Heisman - football coach
Tim Hudson - professional baseball player, All Star pitcher
Stephen Huss - tennis player, 2005 Wimbledon Men's Doubles champion
Bo Jackson - professional football and baseball player, All-Pro, All-Star, Heisman Trophy winner
Ralph Jordan - football coach
Bill Kazmaier - powerlifter, three-time World's Strongest Man
Joanne P. McCallie - basketball coach
Will Muschamp - Head Coach University of Florida
Cam Newton - professional football player, Heisman Trophy winner in 2010, national champion
Frank Sanders - professional football player
Maurice Smith - decathlete
Red Smith - professional baseball player, early 20th century
Takeo Spikes - professional football player
Pat Sullivan - professional football player, Heisman Trophy winner in 1971, current coach of Samford University
Frank Thomas - professional baseball player, All-Star
Tommy Tuberville - football coach
Osi Umenyiora - professional football player, All-Pro
DeMarcus Ware - professional football player
Marcus Washington - professional football player, All-Pro
Joe Whitt, Jr. - cornerbacks coach of the Green Bay Packers
Carnell Williams - professional football player

Business

Timothy D. Cook - Apple Computer Chief Executive Officer
Joe Forehand - Chairman, Accenture
Kenneth R. Giddens - long term director of Voice of America; TV/radio station founder.
Samuel Ginn - wireless communications pioneer and former chairman, Vodafone, board of directors, Chevron, member of Auburn University's Board of Trustees
Charles D. Griffin - President, CarboMedics Inc.
John M. Harbert - Founder and CEO Harbert Corporation 1949-1992
Elmer Beseler Harris - former CEO Alabama Power
Joel Hurt - engineer, Atlanta businessman
Bobby Lowder - Chairman and CEO of Colonial BancGroup
Mark Spencer - President/CEO, Digium, creator of Asterisk PBX
Alvin Vogtle - President, Southern Company; his escape from Stalag Luft III was portrayed in The Great Escape (1963)

Entertainment

Hot Rod Circuit - punk rock band
Jimmy Buffett - entertainer
Bobby Goldsboro - singer, composer
Thom Gossom Jr. - actor, author, speaker
Urbie Green - jazz trombonist
Taylor Hicks - singer, American Idol winner
Mitch Holleman - child actor
Victoria Jackson - comedian
Man or Astro-man? - surf/punk rock band
Eliot Morris - singer
Khari Allen Lee - jazz Saxophonist
Octavia Spencer - Academy Award winning actress
Toni Tennille - singer, "The Captain & Tennille"
Kate Higgins - voice actress, singer, musician

Military

Lloyd Austin - general, Chief of Staff United States Central Command
James H. Lane - Confederate general
James E. Livingston - general, United States Marine Corps, Medal of Honor recipient
Richard Marcinko - founder SEAL Team SIX, author, talk radio host
Forrest S. McCartney - Retired Air Force General
Hal Moore - lieutenant general, portrayed by Mel Gibson in 'We Were Soldiers' (2002)
Carl Epting Mundy, Jr. - Commandant of the United States Marine Corps, (1991-1995)
Hugh Shelton - retired general, Chairman of the Joint Chiefs of Staff, 1997-2001
Holland Smith - general, United States Marine Corps, "father of modern U.S. amphibious warfare"
Johnny Micheal Spann - CIA agent and first American killed in combat in the U.S. invasion of Afghanistan

Politics and government

Spencer Bachus - US Representative, 1993–present
Jere Beasley - Governor of Alabama, 1972; Lieutenant Governor 1971-1979
Sidney Johnston Catts - Governor of Florida, 1917-1921
Lester Crawford - Commissioner of the FDA, 2005
Robert Gibbs - 27th White House Press Secretary
James Thomas Heflin - US Congressman, Representative, 1904-1920; Senator, 1920-1932
Fob James - Governor of Alabama, 1979-1983, 1995-1999
John McDuffie - US Representative, 1919-1935, Majority Whip 1931-1933
Harold Melton - Georgia Supreme Court Justice, 2005–present
William Hall Milton - US Senator, 1908-1909
Gordon Persons - Governor of Alabama, 1951-1955
Wilton Persons - White House Chief of Staff, 1958-1961; major general, U.S. Army
David Addison Reese - US Representative, 1853-1855
William J. Samford - Governor of Alabama, 1900-1901
Joe Turnham - chairman, Alabama Democratic Party
Pete Turnham - former state representative

Other

Keith Black - director of neurosurgery, Cedars-Sinai Medical Center
Lillian Gordy Carter - mother of president Jimmy Carter
William Chen - poker player, World Series of Poker champion
Millard Fuller - founder of Habitat for Humanity
Rheta Grimsley Johnson - syndicated newspaper columnist
Lewis A. Pick - engineer, US Chief of Engineers 1949-1953
Lew Rockwell - president of the Mises Institute
Cynthia Tucker - syndicated columnist, editorial page editor for The Atlanta Journal-Constitution
Jimmy Wales - co-founder of Wikipedia

References

Auburn, Alabama